Palawa may refer to:

Places in India
 Palawa, Alwar, a village in India
 Palawa, Jharkhand, a town in India

Relating to Tasmanian Aboriginal people
 Aboriginal Tasmanians or Palawa people, the Indigenous people of the island state of Tasmania, Australia 
 Palawa languages, group of Tasmanian languages spoken by Indigenous people 
 Palawa kani, a language of the Palawa people

See also
 Palawan (disambiguation)